The Cartagena Container Terminal is the City of Cartagena's principal container management port. It is part of the larger Port of Cartagena. The port authority (Cartagena Container Port Operator) is jointly operated by the Colombian Port Society of Cartagena (Compas S.A.) and the Dutch APM Terminals, who controls 51% of the terminal.

It is the second busiest port in Colombia, behind the Pacific-side port of Buenaventura, and the third busiest port in the Caribbean Sea. It can host vessels with a maximum draft of 16.5m. The terminal has a throughput capacity of 4.5 million TEU's. It is located on the historic sites of the harbours of Cartagena, Spanish colonial-era ports.

The port is strategically well placed to capture sea traffic through the Panama Canal's transoceanic shipping lanes that connect the Atlantic and Pacific Ocean's sea traffic and other traffic around the Caribbean Sea.
However, the wider infrastructure of its location is insufficient, as compared to other international ports, such as the Port of Shanghai or the Port of Houston, lacking multimodal transport; for instance, the lack of railway transport around Colombia, subsequent to the collapse of the national railway company in the late 20th century. Although, investment in railways and multimodal transport has increased since 2010, with British investment in the railways around central a northern Colombia, and Chinese interest in railways to connect Pacific Ocean and Atlantic Ocean ports in Colombia, investment has increased since the Colombian peace process increased stability and security for businesses.

References 

Container terminals
Ports and harbours of Colombia
Cartagena, Colombia